Gurung (exonym) or Tamu (endonym;) are an ethnic group indigenous to the hills and mountains of Gandaki Province of Nepal. Gurung people predominantly live around the Annapurna region in Manang, Mustang, Dolpo, Kaski, Lamjung, Gorkha, Parbat and Syangja districts of Nepal and parts of India. They are one of the main Gurkha tribes.  

They are also scattered across India in Sikkim, Assam, Delhi, West Bengal (Darjeeling area) and other regions with a predominant Nepali diaspora population. They speak the Sino-Tibetan Gurung language and practice Bon religion alongside Tibetan Buddhism and Hinduism.

Gurung caste 
The Tibetan societies from which the Gurungs came had no caste system and within themselves. Yet for several centuries the Gurungs and other hill peoples have been mixing with the caste cultures of Aryan and they have been influenced by them in various ways. As a result, Gurung caste system has been fragmented into two parts: the four-caste (Songhi/ Char-jat) and sixteen-caste (Kuhgi/ Sora-jat) systems. Within there are more than thirty named clans.

Geographical distribution 

At the time of the 2011 Nepal census, 522,641 people (2.0% of the population of Nepal) identified as Gurung. The frequency of Gurung people by province was a follows:
 Gandaki Province (11.4%)
 Bagmati Province (2.2%)
 Koshi Province (1.4%)
 Lumbini Province (0.9%)
 Karnali Province (0.7%)
 Sudurpashchim Province (0.2%)
 Madhesh Province (0.2%)
 
The frequency of Gurung people was higher than national average in the following districts: 
 Manang (57.1%) 
 Lamjung (31.4%)
 Mustang (20.1%)
 Gorkha (19.8%) 
 Kaski (16.7%)
 Tanahun (11.6%)
 Syangja (9.0%)
 Dolpa (7.1%)
 Chitwan (6.8%)
 Dhading (5.6%)
 Sankhuwasabha (5.4%)
 Taplejung (4.6%)
 Parbat (3.7%)
 Rasuwa (3.1%)
 Tehrathum (2.9%)
 Ilam (2.9%)
 Nawalpur (2.9%)
 Kathmandu (2.6%)
 Rupandehi (2.0%).

Religion
The Gurung Dharma include Bon Lam (Lama), Ghyabri (Ghyabring) and  Pachyu (Paju).  Lamas perform Buddhist rituals as needed, such as in birth, funeral, other family rituals (such as in Domang, Tharchang) and in Lhosar. Lamas perform Buddhist ceremonies primarily in Manang, Mustang, and elsewhere. Some Gurung villages have kept remnants of a pre-Buddhist form of the ‘Bon' religion, which flourished over two thousand years ago across much of Tibet and Western China. They've also kept aspects of an even older shamanic belief system that served as a counter to the Bon religion.

See also
 Gurung language
 Gurung (surname), a surname of many Gurung people

References

Further reading

External links

 
 

Buddhist communities of Nepal
Ethnic groups in Nepal
Ethnic groups in Northeast India
Ethnic groups in South Asia
Gurkhas
Indigenous peoples of Nepal
Social groups of Nepal
Buddhist communities of India